Aqcheh Kand (also Romanized as Āqcheh Kand) is a village in Darsajin Rural District, in the Central District of Abhar County, Zanjan Province, Iran. At the 2006 census, its population was 145, in 43 families.

References 

Populated places in Abhar County